Nikita Alekseevich Ignatyev (born 21 June 1992 in Novosibirsk, Novosibirsk Oblast, Russia) is a Russian artistic gymnast. He is the 2015 European Games All-around bronze medalist.

Competitive history

Career
Ignatyev has started gymnastics since 1997. In 2003 he moved to the town of Leninsk-Kuznetsky, training in the sports school for gymnastics. In 2010 he attended the Kuzbass State Pedagogical Academy and selected to be with the Russian team for men's artistic gymnastics. He won the all-around at the 28th Gander Memorial in Morges, Switzerland.

In 2012, Ignatyev was not selected to compete but was an alternate for the Russian men's team for the 2012 London Olympics.

In 2013, Ignatyev, alongside the Russian team (Nikolai Kuksenkov, Emin Garibov, Denis Ablyazin and David Belyavskiy) won Russia the team gold at the 2013 Summer Universiade in Kazan.

On May 19–25, 2014, at the 2014 European Championships in Sofia. Ignatyev along with teammates (Denis Ablyazin, Aleksandr Balandin, David Belyavskiy, Nikolai Kuksenkov) won Russia the Team Event gold medal with a total score of 267.959 ahead of Great Britain. 
At the 2014 World Championships in Nanning, Ignatyev also competed along teammates (Denis Ablyazin, David Belyavskiy, Nikolai Kuksenkov, Daniil Kazachkov and Ivan Stretovich) with Team Russia finishing 5th in the Team Final.

In June 2015, Ignatyev competed in the 2015 European Games, winning gold in the Team Competition (with teammates David Belyavskiy and Nikolai Kuksenkov). He qualified for the all-around ahead of teammate Nikolai Kuksenkov and won the all-around bronze. In apparatus finals, he won silver in Rings and silver in Horizontal Bar. He became the all-around champion at the Russian Cup in September.

Ignatyev was member the Russian men competing at the 2015 World Championships in Glasgow, together with teammates (Denis Ablyazin, Ivan Stretovich, Nikolai Kuksenkov, Nikita Nagornyy and David Belyavskiy)

On May 25–29, Ignatyev (together with David Belyavskiy, Denis Ablyazin, Nikolai Kuksenkov and Nikita Nagornyy) won Russia the Team gold at the 2016 European Championships. Ignatyev was initially named to the Olympic Team for the 2016 Summer Olympics in Rio de Janeiro, Brazil, but was replaced by Ivan Stretovich only a few days before the Games began.

In 2021 Ignatyev competed at the World Championships. He qualified for the All-Around final and finished 17.

References

External links
 Nikita Ignatyev FIG
 Nikita Ignatyev Profile 
 Nikita Ignatyev Sports Bio 
 
 Gymnastics Results

Russian male artistic gymnasts
Sportspeople from Novosibirsk
1992 births
Living people
Gymnasts at the 2015 European Games
European Games medalists in gymnastics
European Games gold medalists for Russia
European Games silver medalists for Russia
European Games bronze medalists for Russia
Universiade medalists in gymnastics
Universiade gold medalists for Russia
Medalists at the 2013 Summer Universiade
21st-century Russian people